Fritz Hoffmann-La Roche, later Fritz Hoffmann-von der Mühll (1868  1920), was a Swiss businessman who founded the pharmaceutical company F. Hoffmann-LaRoche & Co.

Early life 
Hoffmann was born in Basel, Switzerland on the 24 October 1868 as the third child of Friedrich Hoffmann and Anna Elisabeth Merian. His godfathers were the parental grandfather Johan Heinrich Merian von der Mühll, his uncle, the Mayor of Basel Carl Felix Burckhardt von der Mühll and Anna Von der Mühll. His family were wealthy businesspeople from Basel's social elite (called the "Daig"), and they provided both employment experience and investment at the beginning of his business career. In the 1870s and 80s he absolved primary and high school in Basel and then absolved an apprenticeship at a bank in francophone part of Switzerland. When he returned to Basel in 1889 he entered a second internship at a pharmaceuical company. Between 1891 and 1892 he stayed in London, and between 1892 – 1893 in Hamburg to further his experience in chemistry related business. Upon his return to Basel his father became a shareholder of his former employer in Basel who then gave Fritz Hoffmann a leading position in the business.

Marriages and children 
On 2 May 1895, Hoffmann married Adèle La Roche (18761938). It was a common practice in Switzerland for married couples to hyphenate the name, so from this point he was often referred to as Fritz Hoffmann-La Roche.

They had two sons, Emmanuel (4 May 1896, Basel  3 October 1932, Basel) and Alfred (25 July 18981987). The couple were divorced in 1919, and he married divorcée Elisabeth von der Mühll, also of the Daig (18821970).

Business career 
In 1894, he formed a company with Max Carl Traub (18551919) called Hoffmann, Traub & Co., which manufactured a limited range of pharmaceutical and chemical products. His father contributed the majority of the capital, and Traub some patents and contracts. In 1896, Traub left the company, and it was renamed F. Hoffmann-La Roche & Co.

According to Peyer (see below), "For his time, Fritz Hoffmann was unusually interested in product promotion and paid attention to all aspects of publicity from simple advertising to packaging and promotion of key individuals such as pharmacists. He also built up international contacts for raw materials and product sales, and supported research. Following the setback of the 1st World War, these factors helped the company to recover and expand. He retired from the board of the company because of ill-health in 1919 and died the following year."

Notes and references 

1868 births
1920 deaths
19th-century Swiss people
20th-century Swiss people
Hoffmann-La Roche people
Pharmaceutical company founders
Businesspeople from Basel-Stadt
Fritz